Wern Las railway station was a station to the west of Kinnerley, Shropshire, England. The station was opened in 1919 and closed in 1933.

References

Further reading

Disused railway stations in Shropshire
Railway stations in Great Britain opened in 1919
Railway stations in Great Britain closed in 1933